This list of caves in Croatia includes 49 which are deeper than , 14 deeper than  and three deeper than . The karst geology harbours a total of approximately 7,000 caves and pits.

Deepest caves

Longest caves

Other notable caves

See also 

 List of caves
 Speleology

References

Sources
 

 
Croatia
Caves